The phrase Defence Force(s) (or Defense Force(s) in US English - see spelling differences) is in the title of the armed forces of certain countries and territories.

Defence forces
Ambazonia Defence Forces
Artsakh Defence Army
Australian Defence Force
Bahrain Defence Force
Barbados Defence Force
Belize Defence Force
Botswana Defence Force
Bundeswehr: Federal Defence Forces of Germany.
Burundi National Defence Force
Danish Defence: the unified armed forces of the Kingdom of Denmark
Defense Forces of Georgia
Defence Force of Haiti
Eritrean Defence Forces
Estonian Defence Forces
Ethiopian National Defense Force
Falkland Islands Defence Force
Finnish Defence Forces
Guyana Defence Force
Hungarian Defence Force
Irish Defence Forces
Israel Defense Forces
Jamaica Defence Force
Japan Self-Defense Forces
Kenya Defence Forces
Lesotho Defence Force
Lithuanian National Defence Volunteer Forces
Malawian Defence Force
Maldives National Defence Force
Mozambique Defence Armed Forces
Namibia Defence Force
National Defence Forces (Syria): Syrian pro-government militia 
New Zealand Defence Force
Norwegian Defence: the unified armed forces of the Kingdom of Norway
Papua New Guinea Defence Force
People's Liberation Army Navy Coastal Defense Force
Antigua and Barbuda Defence Force
Royal Bahamas Defence Force
Royal Montserrat Defence Force
Rwanda Defence Force
Saint Kitts and Nevis Defence Force
Self-Defense Forces in the multi-ethnic territories of North and East Syria opposed to Bashar al-Assad
Seychelles People's Defence Force
Singapore Civil Defence Force: provides emergency services in Singapore
South African National Defence Force
South Sudan Defence Forces (militia)
South Sudan People's Defense Forces
Southern Cameroons Defence Forces
State defense forces: defense forces of individual US states.
Tanzania People's Defence Force
Territorial Defence Force (Poland)
Territorial Defence Force (Ukraine)
Tigray Defense Forces
Timor Leste Defence Force
Trinidad and Tobago Defence Force
Umbutfo Eswatini Defence Force
Uganda People's Defence Force
Vietnam Self-Defence Force
Zambian Defence Force
Zimbabwe Defence Forces

Air Defence Forces
Air defence forces (Anti-Aircraft Warfare)
Cuban Air and Air Defense Force
Egyptian Air Defense Forces
Islamic Republic of Iran Air Defense Force
Kazakh Air Defense Forces: Air Force of Kazakhstan
Syrian Air Defense Force
Territorial Air Defence Forces: Part of the Algerian People's National Armed Forces
Ukrainian Air Defence Forces
Uzbekistan Air and Air Defence Forces

At the start of the Cold War, the United States Air Force had established the Aerospace Defense Command. It was broken into three different regions:
Eastern Air Defense Force: (1949-1960)
Central Air Defense Force: (1951-1960)
Western Air Defense Force: (1949-1960)

Defunct Defence Forces
British Solomon Islands Protectorate Defence Force (1889-1976) 
Ceylon Defence Force: Regular force of British Ceylon (1881-1949)
Citizens' Defence Force: A unit of former British Army soldiers and Irish Volunteers organised by Ireland during the Irish Civil War (1922)
Croatian Defence Forces: (1991-1993)
Wehrmacht: Wehrmacht translated to defence forces (1935-1945)
Fatherland Defense Force: A short-lived Wehrmacht-backed Lithuanian military unit made to defend Lithuania against the Soviet Army (1944)
Iceland Defense Force: (1951-2006)
Indian Defence Force: (1917-1920)
Lithuanian Territorial Defense Force: (1944)
Lofa Defense Force: Liberian Rebel Group (1993-1996)
Panama Defense Forces: (1968-1989)
People's Self-Defense Force: South Vietnamese militia (1968-1975)
Popular Defence Forces: Paramilitary Force in Sudan (1989-2019)
Royal Hong Kong Defence Force: (1960s-1970)
Russian Aerospace Defence Forces: (2011-2015)
South African Defence Force: (1957-1994)
Soviet Air Defence Forces: (1941-1991)
Sudan Defence Force: (1924-1955)
Territorial Defence Force of the Republic of Bosnia and Herzegovina: (1990-1992)
Territorial Defense Forces (Yugoslavia): (1969-1992)
Union Defence Force (South Africa): Predecessor to the South African Defence Force (1912-1957)
United Self-Defense Forces of Colombia: (1997-2008)
Zanzibar Volunteer Defence Force: (1914-????)

South Africa
In South Africa under apartheid the nominally independent Bantustans had their own forces, separately from the South African Defence Force:
Bophuthatswana Defence Force: (1977-1994)
Ciskei Defence Force: (1981-1994)
Transkei Defence Force: (1981-1994)
Venda Defence Force: (1979-1994)

Football clubs
A number of football clubs related to defence forces are also named such, for example:
Defence Force F.C., of Trinidad and Tobago
Barbados Defence Force SC
Belize Defence Force FC
Botswana Defence Force XI
Guyana Defence Force FC
Lesotho Defence Force FC

See also
Chief of the Defence Force (disambiguation)

Types of military forces
International security
National security